Futoshi (written: 太 or 太志) is a masculine Japanese given name. Notable people with the name include:

, Georgian sumo wrestler
, Japanese footballer
, Japanese serial killer
, Japanese rugby union player
, Japanese baseball player and coach
, Japanese musician

Japanese masculine given names